is a former Japanese football player.

Playing career
Furube was born in Fukuyama on December 9, 1970. After graduating from Osaka University of Health and Sport Sciences, he joined the Regional Leagues club Kagawa Shiun in 1993. In 1994, he moved to the Japan Football League club Fujieda Blux (later Avispa Fukuoka). He played many matches as center back and the club won the championship in 1995. From 1996, the club was promoted to the J1 League and he played as regular player. In 1999, he moved to the newly-promoted J2 League club, FC Tokyo. The club was promoted to the J1 League in 2000. However, he rarely played in any matches that year. In 2001, he moved to the Japan Football League club Sagawa Express Tokyo. He retired at the end of the 2001 season.

Club statistics

References

External links

J.LEAGUE YEARBOOK 2011, 2011 

1970 births
Living people
Osaka University of Health and Sport Sciences alumni
Association football people from Hiroshima Prefecture
Japanese footballers
J1 League players
J2 League players
Japan Football League (1992–1998) players
Japan Football League players
Kamatamare Sanuki players
Avispa Fukuoka players
FC Tokyo players
Sagawa Shiga FC players
Association football defenders